Jeannette Alejandra Jara Román (born 23 April 1974) is a Chilean politician who currently serves as Minister of Labor and Social Provision.

References

External links
 

1974 births
Living people
University of Santiago, Chile alumni
Central University of Chile alumni
21st-century Chilean politicians
Communist Party of Chile politicians
Government ministers of Chile
Women government ministers of Chile